The 2021–22 Pertiwi Cup is the seventh edition of Pertiwi Cup. The tournament started on 18 March 2022 and ended on 28 March 2022. All matches were played in Bandung, West Java. The tournament was organized by  under supervision of PSSI.

Provincial round

National round

Group stage

Group A

Group B

Group C

Group D

Knockout stage
All times were local, WIB (UTC+7).

Bracket

Quarter-finals

Semi-finals

Third place

Final

Top goalscorers

Notes

References

External links 
 

Pertiwi Cup
Pertiwi Cup seasons
Pertiwi Cup
Pertiwi Cup